is a song recorded by Japanese singer LiSA, released on October 18, 2021. The song was featured as the first opening theme song for the anime Demon Slayer: Kimetsu no Yaiba – Mugen Train Arc. It charted at  1 on the Oricon Daily Digital Singles Chart with 36,062 downloads in its first day release. The song also peaked at number one on Japan Hot 100 and number 107 on Billboard Global 200.

Background and release
On September 25, 2021, LiSA's official website announced that she will be performing the opening and ending themes for the anime Demon Slayer: Kimetsu no Yaiba – Mugen Train Arc premiering on October 10, 2021, with "Akeboshi" as the opening theme and "Shirogane" as the ending theme. Both songs were released as a double A-side single on November 17, 2021. Prior to the single's release, "Akeboshi" is available for download from October 18, 2021.

Composition
"Akeboshi" is composed in the key of C-sharp major and is set in time signature of common time with a tempo of 95 BPM, runs for four minutes and 29 seconds. Written and composed by Yuki Kajiura, the song starts with strings in the intro, giving off an atmosphere of fantasy, melancholy, and mystery; then a guitar riffs reverberates through the middle of the song. The melody is reminiscent of Aimer's song "I Beg You" which also composed by Kajiura. LiSA describes "Akeboshi" as a song of entrusted thoughts, hopes and curses.

Music video
The music video for "Akeboshi" was released on November 7, 2021, and directed by Masakazu Fukatsu. Based on the world view of the song, it expresses "a hope in the midst of chaos". It shows LiSA performing the song in a railroad tunnel illuminated by lanterns and on a lawn surrounded by flames at night, mixing with images of liquids called "Alive Painting" created by painter Akiko Nakayama. As of May 2022, "Akeboshi" has over 20 million views on YouTube.

Personnel
 LiSA – vocals
 Yuki Kajiura – lyrics, composer, arranger, keyboards, programming
 Tomoharu Takahashi – bass guitar
 Koichi Korenaga – guitar
 Kyoichi Sato – drums
 Hitoshi Konno – strings
 Takashi Koiwa – record, mixing
 Nobuyuki Murakami – record
 Mio Hirai – assistant engineer

Charts

Weekly charts

Year-end charts

Sales and certifications

Awards and nominations

References

2021 songs
Anime songs
Billboard Japan Hot 100 number-one singles
Demon Slayer: Kimetsu no Yaiba
Japanese pop songs
LiSA (Japanese musician, born 1987) songs
Songs written by Yuki Kajiura